"Brother's Keeper" is the pilot episode of the first season of the American television series Miami Vice. The episode premiered on September 16, 1984, with a two-hour (including commercials) season premiere. The episode was received well critically, winning two out of three Emmy Awards for which it was nominated.

NBC would rebroadcast the episode in 2006 during the opening weekend for executive producer/director Michael Mann's theatrical remake starring Colin Farrell and Jamie Foxx.

Plot
James "Sonny" Crockett (Don Johnson) is a Metro-Dade vice detective who has just lost his partner Eddie Rivera (Jimmy Smits) due to a car bombing while they were trying to arrest a small-time drug dealer. He also is in the middle of an ugly divorce, since his wife can't stand the stress of having a husband working undercover with criminals.

Crockett is investigating a Colombian drug dealer, named Calderone (Miguel Piñero), when he meets a New York police detective named Rafael Tubbs (Philip Michael Thomas). Since they are having problems approaching Calderone due to a traitor (leading Tubbs to say "You've got a leak in your department the size of the East River"), Crockett and Tubbs team up, after a suggestion from the former's lieutenant Lou Rodriguez (Gregory Sierra) to work together, even though they don't like each other.

Crockett is also dating a colleague, Gina Calabrese (Saundra Santiago). But he is not very fortunate, since he whispers his wife's name to Gina, while they were in bed. Gina and her colleague Trudy Joplin (Olivia Brown) still help Crockett for all job matters, and they discover that Rafael Tubbs is actually a dead New York officer. Crockett confronts "Rafael" and discovers that he is Rafael's brother Ricardo who wants to catch Calderone, his brother's murderer.

Crockett and Tubbs agree to still work together and it pays off, discovering that the traitor is Scott Wheeler (Bill Smitrovich), a DEA agent who works closely with the vice squad. After being confronted and assaulted by Crockett (his former partner), Wheeler is then arrested. Soon afterwards, Calderone himself is arrested, but within a matter of hours gets a judge to sign his release on $2 million bail. Sonny and Rico arrive just in time to see Calderone get into a seaplane (which later in real life crashes as Chalk's Ocean Airways Flight 101) and fly off. Crockett and Tubbs decide that they like working with each other after all, and Tubbs decides to transfer to Miami.

Notes
Most of the series regular cast are introduced in this pilot episode: Sonny Crockett (Don Johnson), Ricardo Tubbs (Philip Michael Thomas), Gina Calabrese (Saundra Santiago), Trudy Joplin (Olivia Brown), Stan Switek (Michael Talbott) and Larry Zito (John Diehl). Only Edward James Olmos is missing, since his character, Lt. Martin Castillo would not show until the sixth episode. The Squad's boss was for the first four episodes Lt. Rodriguez (Gregory Sierra). This episode also featured regular supporting actor Martin Ferrero, but he played the transvestite killer Trini DeSoto instead of his usual Izzy Moreno character, the small and incompetent criminal who confides to Crockett and Tubbs. The opening theme to the episode is an extended version of the "Miami Vice Theme" which is only used for the first four episodes of the series. After that, the Miami Vice opening theme was altered to include the signature electric guitar riff over the original Fairlight-generated synthesizer sequence. From then on, it remained unchanged throughout the series.

This episode, which has a 2-hour duration (with commercials) is also sometimes split as a two-part episode each an hour long in some countries. On the Region 1 Miami Vice DVD release, the episode is presented in its entirety; the Region 2 version uses the two-part version.

At least one VHS release of "Brother's Keeper" replaces the Rolling Stones' song "Miss You" with generic rock music.

Style
This episode started developing the trademark Vice style. Aspects of Miami Vice considered revolutionary lay in its music, cinematography, and imagery, which made large segments of each episode resemble a protracted music video. A good example of combining these three aspects is found in this episode when Crockett and Tubbs are in the Ferrari Daytona Spyder, driving through a damp, nighttime Miami downtown heading to a somber showdown with a sinister, murderous drug lord as "In the Air Tonight" by Phil Collins surrealistically plays along. As Lee H. Katzin, one of the series' directors, once stated, "The show is written for an MTV audience, which is more interested in images, emotions and energy than plot and character and words."

The pilot included some of the series trademarks, such as Crocketts' Ferrari Daytona Spyder 365 GTS/4, his boat, the St. Vitus Dance and Elvis, his pet alligator. Other stylistic accents, such as Crockett's famous tortoise shell Ray-Ban Wayfarers or Tubbs's 1964 Cadillac Coupe de Ville were still missing (Crockett wears Carrera 5512 Large sunglasses, and Tubbs drives a dark 1983 Pontiac Trans Am in one scene).

Awards and nominations
This episode was nominated for three Emmy awards and won two Emmys, for best sound editing and cinematography.

Music
"Only in Miami" by Bette Midler
"Miss You" by the Rolling Stones (replaced by generic, instrumental rock music for at least one VHS release of "Brother's Keeper" from MCA Home Video)
"Body Talk" by the Deele
"All Night Long (All Night)" by Lionel Richie (Sung by a band)
"Somebody's Watching Me" by Rockwell
"Girls Just Want to Have Fun" by Cyndi Lauper (cover version)
"In the Air Tonight" by Phil Collins (also used in the fourth-season episode "A Bullet for Crockett")
"What's Love Got to do With It" by Tina Turner (plays during the end credits)
Song listing found on IMDB "Brother's Keeper" Soundtracks Page

References

External links
Miami Vice at wildhorse.com

1984 American television episodes
Miami Vice
American television series premieres